7N or 7N may refer to :

7N or 7°N, the 7th parallel north latitude
 Canon EOS Elan 7N, a 2004 35 mm film single-lens reflex camera
 Centavia, IATA airline designator
Nitrogen (7N), a chemical element
Pye 7N, numbering system for recordings used by Pye Records
Piccadilly 7N, numbering system for recordings used by Piccadilly unit of  Pye Records
7N, the production code for the 1989 Doctor Who serial Battlefield

See also
N7 (disambiguation)